The Autonomous Socialist Party of Southern Jura, is a Swiss francophone subcantonal political party in the Northern Bernese Jura district of the Canton of Bern, affiliated to the Jura Socialist Party, itself a part of the Swiss Socialist Party (SP/PS). It coexists with the Bernese Jura Socialist Party (PSJB), affiliated to the cantonal Bernese Socialist Party, also affiliated to the federal SP/PS. The PSA favours a unification of the French-speaking district of the Canton of Bern with the French-speaking Canton of Jura, while the PSJB opposes it.

Sources

Social Democratic Party of Switzerland